Luc Andrieux (1917–1977) was a French actor and assistant director.

Partial filmography

 The Queen's Necklace (1946) - Un geôlier (uncredited)
 Le Bataillon du ciel (1947)
 Les aventures des pieds nickeles (1948) - Hector
 The Cupboard Was Bare (1948) - Le troisième habitué
 Five Red Tulips (1949) - Charles Brugeat
 Le trésor des Pieds-Nickelés (1950) - Hector
 The Girl from Maxim's (1950) - Etienne
 Uniformes et grandes manoeuvres (1950) - Le Parachutiste
 Street Without a King (1950) - Le cambrioleur (uncredited)
 La grande vie (1951) - Le voleur
 Le crime du Bouif (1952) - Le premier policier
 Three Women (1952) - Un employé
 Bille de clown (1952)
 La Putain respectueuse (1952) - Le barman
 Mon curé chez les riches (1952) - Brochut
 A Hundred Francs a Second (1952) - Le mauvais garçon (uncredited)
 Quitte ou double (1952)
 The Last Robin Hood (1953) - Un complice
 Follow That Man (1953) - Le régisseur du studio de cinéma (uncredited)
 Le gang des pianos à bretelles (1953)
 Le Chevalier de la nuit (1953) - Le cocher
 This Man Is Dangerous (1953) - Maurice
 Les révoltés de Lomanach (1954) - Un soldat qui veut dormir (uncredited)
 Service Entrance (1954) - Le serrurier
 Le fil à la patte (1954) - Le serrurier (uncredited)
 The Infiltrator (1955) - Max (uncredited)
 Pas de coup dur pour Johnny (1955)
 Les évadés (1955) - Un prisonnier
 Papa, maman, ma femme et moi (1955) - Le déménageur (uncredited)
 Eighteen Hour Stopover (1955) - Le barman
 Cherchez la femme (1955)
 Four Days in Paris (1955) - Le gendarme
 La Madelon (1955) - Un adjudant (uncredited)
 Une fille épatante (1955) - Le barman
 Ce soir les jupons volent... (1956) - Legris le fils de la bouchère
 Miss Catastrophe (1957)
 L'ami de la famille (1957)
 Comme un cheveu sur la soupe (1957) - L'éclusier (uncredited)
 Les Misérables (1958) - Henri - un ouvrier insurgé
 Head Against the Wall (1959) - Un infirmier
 The 400 Blows (1959) - Le professeur de gym
 Un couple (1960) - (uncredited)
 Le caïd (1960) - Un agent de stationnement (uncredited)
 Snobs! (1962) - Le gendarme sur l'échelle (uncredited)
 La salamandre d'or (1962) - Un convoyeur d'or (uncredited)
 Heaven Sent (1963) - Un clochard au landeau (uncredited)
 Les compagnons de la marguerite (1967) - Le technicien (uncredited)
 Mise à sac (1967) - L'agent Albert
 La grande lessive! (1968) - Le chauffeur du fourgon de police (uncredited)
 L'étalon (1970) - Brig. Zorba
 Solo (1970) - Le pompiste (uncredited)
 L'Albatros (1971) - Un gendarme
 No Pockets in a Shroud (1974) - Le tueur à la mitraillette (uncredited) (final film role)

External links

1917 births
1977 deaths
French male film actors
People from Coutances
20th-century French male actors